Nyamugali is an administrative ward in Buhigwe District  of Kigoma Region of Tanzania. In 2016 the Tanzania National Bureau of Statistics report there were 11,783 people in the ward, from 10,705 in 2012.

Villages / neighborhoods 
The ward has 3 villages and 10 hamlets.

 Nyamugali 
 Sokoni
 Lukunda
 Kikulazo
 Nyomvyi
 Bulimanyi 
 Bwera
 Buhinda
 Lulengela
 Kigege 
 Mubanga
 Kigege
 Kurugongo

References

Buhigwe District
Wards of Kigoma Region